Sir Charles Michael Dennis Byron (born 4 July 1943) is a former president of the Caribbean Court of Justice. He also serves as President of the Commonwealth Judicial Education Institute, and is former President of the International Criminal Tribunal for Rwanda (ICTR), and former Chief Justice of the Eastern Caribbean Supreme Court. He was born in Basseterre, Saint Kitts and Nevis.

Early life and career

Byron won the Leeward Islands Scholarship in 1960 and went on to read law at Fitzwilliam College, Cambridge. At Fitzwilliam, he won his oar as a member of the College’s top rowing team in the May Bumps for 1964. He graduated with an M.A and LL.B. in 1966. In 1965, he was called to the Bar of England and Wales by the Honourable Society of the Inner Temple.

He distinguished himself in private practice as a Barrister-at-Law and Solicitor throughout the Leeward Islands, with Chambers in Saint Kitts, Nevis and Anguilla from 1966 to 1982.

Judicial career

Sir Dennis Byron's judicial career began in 1982 at the age of 38 when he was appointed as a High Court Judge of the Eastern Caribbean Supreme Court, a federal Court serving six independent countries together with three Crown Colonies of Great Britain. He was soon frequently sitting as a Court of Appeal Judge in an acting capacity before being appointed a substantive member of the Court of Appeal in 1990. 

In 1986, as Acting Chief Justice of the Supreme Court of Grenada, on secondment from the Eastern Caribbean Supreme Court, he presided over the famous murder trial involving the assassination of Prime Minister Maurice Bishop – the longest criminal trial in Caribbean history.

In 1995, over a five-month period, in tandem with Operation Uphold Democracy, Sir Dennis, with two other international Judges, and a full supporting team, organized judicial education programmes for the Haitian Judiciary. This was an initiative of the National Center for State Courts of the United States in the wake of the restoration of President Jean-Bertrand Aristide in Haiti.

In 1999, Judge Byron was appointed Chief Justice of the Eastern Caribbean Supreme Court, having acted in that position for two years. As Chief Justice, he was the supreme judicial officer of the courts of Anguilla, Antigua and Barbuda, the British Virgin Islands, Dominica, Grenada, Montserrat, Saint Kitts and Nevis, Saint Lucia, and Saint Vincent and the Grenadines.

As Acting Chief Justice, Judge Byron made the establishment of the Eastern Caribbean Supreme Court Judicial Reform Programme a matter of high priority. In 1997, he launched the Judicial Education Institute as a Committee of the Chief Justice’s Office. The Committee produced a Code of Ethics for Judges, and organized a series of seminars and training programmes providing orientation for Judges, lawyers and trial Court Registrars. This Programme was a prelude to the modernisation of practice and procedure in litigation, which was brought to fruition when Chief Justice Byron introduced the new Civil Procedure Rules 2000, which came into operation as of 31 December 2000. These new Rules, tailored to the norms of the Eastern Caribbean, are in keeping with the ethos of judicial case management which informs the Woolf Reforms instituted in England in 1998. Byron was the first Chief Justice to implement the English-modelled Civil Procedure Rules in the Caribbean region. With these reforms, he set a three-fold objective, namely, the enhancement of public access to the Court by simplifying procedures, the reduction of the delay of litigation from start to finish, and the inculcation of a higher standard of professionalism at the Bar.

Byron chaired the Rules Reform Committee, and hosted workshops for lawyers in different Caribbean islands, to which he invited a Judge, a Master and a leading practitioner from Canada to share their experiences and advice with regard to their own shift to case management by the Court.

He has been President of the Commonwealth Judicial Education Institute in Halifax, Canada since the year 2000.

In 2000, he was knighted by Queen Elizabeth II and he was appointed a member of Her Majesty’s Most Honourable Privy Council in 2004, making him only the second national of St. Kitts and Nevis to be appointed, following the appointment of the country's first Prime Minister, Dr Kennedy Simmonds, in 1984. Also in 2004, he was appointed as an Honorary Bencher of the Honourable Society of the Inner Temple.

In March 2001, then Chief Justice Byron was a member of an international delegation of jurists who travelled to Zimbabwe on a Fact-Finding Mission on behalf of the Human Rights Institute of the International Bar Association, inquiring into reports of abuses against the Rule of Law by the Robert Mugabe Government. The 7-member Mission was headed by Lord Goldsmith, QC, who was soon to become Attorney General of England and Wales. The IBA is the world’s leading organization of Bar Associations, Law Societies and legal practitioners, drawn from 183 countries and representing 2.5 million lawyers.

At the invitation of then-Secretary General of the United Nations Kofi Annan, Judge Byron, while serving as Chief Justice of the Eastern Caribbean Supreme Court, from which position he retired, became a permanent Judge of the United Nations International Criminal Tribunal for Rwanda (ICTR) in 2004. The ICTR was established by the United Nations Security Council to try war crimes committed during the Rwandan genocide of nearly 1 million people in 1994. Sir Dennis was elected President of the Tribunal in May 2007 and re-elected for a second term in May 2009. He was elected and re-elected President by his fellow Judges. 

As President of the ICTR which is located in Arusha, Tanzania, Sir Dennis is also an Under-Secretary General of the United Nations. He is responsible for the overall management of that International Tribunal and for liaising with Member States as well as the Security Council. He oversees the implementation of ICTR strategic policies and the management of its external relations. He provides the dedicated leadership and commitment for the realization of the Tribunal's overall Completion Strategy without sacrificing any of the vital safeguards of due process and fair trial rights.
He has regularly addressed the Security Council of the United Nations in New York City to deliver six-monthly Reports on behalf of the Tribunal in his capacity as President on the progress of the Security Council's Completion Strategy.

Byron sat on seven trial benches and served on a number of pre-trial benches while at the Tribunal. He presides over the multi-accused Karemera, et al. trial, also known as Government I, involving Édouard Karemera, former Minister of the Interior of Rwanda, and Matthieu Ngirumpatse, former President of the MRND. 

On 16 March 2011, he delivered the 9th Annual Ruth Steinkraus-Cohen International Law Lecture of the United Nations Association of London hosted by the School of Oriental and African Studies of the University of London. He also holds the first Yogis & Keddy Chair in Human Rights Law at Dalhousie University.

In 2010, Byron was made an Honorary Fellow by his Alma Mater, Fitzwilliam College of Cambridge University. In a recent interview with Radio Netherlands Worldwide, he highlighted two judgments of the ICTR as trend-setting in international law. Akayesu, which was the first case at the international level to interpret genocide in the light of the Genocide Convention and is recognized as an authority in International Criminal Law on sexual violence in conflict situations. As a result of this precedent, rape is now a crime of genocide.  

In mid-March 2011, it was announced that Byron was appointed as the new President of the Caribbean Court of Justice (CCJ) during the recent Caribbean Community (CARICOM) Heads of Government Inter-Sessional Summit in Grenada. This appointment followed a unanimous recommendation by the Regional and Judicial Legal Services Commission. 

He ended his tenure of four years as President of the International Criminal Tribunal for Rwanda in May 2011 and was sworn in as President of the CCJ in his home country of Saint Kitts and Nevis on 1 September 2011; he demitted office on 4 July 2018.

Personal life

Dennis Byron is the son of the late Vincent F. Byron Sr., M.B.E., former senior civil servant who served as warden of Anguilla and who on occasion acted as Governor-General's deputy to former Governor-General Sir Clement Arrindell, Q.C., Sir Dennis's uncle-in-law. Vincent Byron Sr. and his wife, Pearl Byron, both died in 1998. 

Dennis Byron's sister, Helen Marcella Byron-Baker, was a former senior property manager at Durst Fetner, one of the largest property developers in New York. His younger brothers are Vincent F. Byron Jr., former St. Kitts and Nevis Ambassador to the Republic of China on Taiwan and South Korea, and Terence  Byron, CMG, who acted as Attorney-General of the Federation of St. Kitts and Nevis on a number of occasions between 1985 and 1995. 

Sir Dennis Byron is married to Lady Norma Byron, and is the father of four children.

References

External links

 

1943 births
Living people
Alumni of Fitzwilliam College, Cambridge
Barristers and advocates
Knights Bachelor
Members of the Inner Temple
Presidents of the International Criminal Tribunal for Rwanda
Saint Kitts and Nevis judges
Chief justices of the Eastern Caribbean Supreme Court
Caribbean Court of Justice judges
Saint Kitts and Nevis judges on the courts of Grenada
Saint Kitts and Nevis judges on the courts of Anguilla
Saint Kitts and Nevis judges on the courts of Antigua and Barbuda
Saint Kitts and Nevis judges on the courts of Dominica
Saint Kitts and Nevis judges on the courts of Montserrat
Saint Kitts and Nevis judges on the courts of Saint Lucia
Saint Kitts and Nevis judges on the courts of Saint Vincent and the Grenadines
Saint Kitts and Nevis judges on the courts of the British Virgin Islands
Members of the Privy Council of the United Kingdom
Saint Kitts and Nevis judges of United Nations courts and tribunals
Saint Kitts and Nevis judges of international courts and tribunals